"A Real Hero" is a song by French electronica artist College in collaboration with Electric Youth, released in 2010. The song was included as the eleventh track on Electric Youth's debut studio album Innerworld. The track was used as a main theme in the 2011 film Drive, directed by Nicolas Winding Refn and starring Ryan Gosling and Carey Mulligan.

Production
Electric Youth frontman Austin Garrick, along with David Grellier, who performs as College, have cited separate inspirations for producing the song.

Garrick was inspired to write the song by a quote from his grandfather, who spoke of airline captain Chesley Sullenberger after the US Airways Flight 1549 water landing incident. Garrick's grandfather referred to Sullenberger as "a real human being and a real hero", which became the song's refrain. The second verse of the song, which includes the line "155 people on board", refers to the 155 survivors of US 1549.

Grellier, on the other hand, took inspiration from cinema, in particular the character Max Rockatansky of the Mad Max franchise. Grellier has stated that he "wanted to give a homage to that lonely hero that we see in movies like Mad Max. People who make their own choice and try to save lives. I want to give an homage." The first verse of the song is more along these lines and could be taken to be about Mad Max himself, although it could also be about Sullenberger.

Cover versions
Indie pop group Smallpools released a cover version of the song on May 12, 2015, through RCA Records and Sony Music Entertainment. The cover was uploaded to audio distribution platform SoundCloud on May 13.

Track listing

Personnel
 Bronwyn Griffin – vocals
 Austin Garrick – production, writing
 David Grellier – production
 Tom Marnell - Instrumentals, Production, Videography

Release history and reception

Spin magazine named "A Real Hero" one of the 20 Best Songs of 2011. The song was nominated for a 2012 MTV Movie Award in the category of "Best Music".

In popular culture
The song is featured in the 2011 film Drive and the 2012 film Taken 2.

References

External links
 College & Electric Youth - A Real Hero (Music From the Motion Picture Drive) on SoundCloud

2010 singles
2010 songs
2011 singles
Songs written for films
Synthwave songs